These are lists of Bundesliga top scorers. This league is the top level of the German football league system and started in 1963.

Bundesliga players with 100 or more goals

Key
 Bold shows players still playing in the Bundesliga.
 Italics show players still playing professional football in other leagues.

Most Bundesliga goals by club
Current Bundesliga clubs and players are shown in bold.
.

See also
List of Bundesliga players
List of Bundesliga top scorers by season
List of Bundesliga hat-tricks
Bundesliga records and statistics
Pichichi Trophy
 Premier League Golden Boot
 Capocannoniere
 List of Süper Lig top scorers
 List of Eredivisie top scorers
 List of Ukrainian Premier League top scorers
 List of Portugal Premier League top scorers
 List of Russian Premier League top scorers
 List of Ligue 1 top scorers
 List of top international association football goal scorers by country

References

Association football player non-biographical articles
Goals
Goals
Germany